Dinda Kirana Sukmawati, known as Dinda Kirana (born April 30, 1995) is an Indonesian actress and singer. She has appeared on the soap opera Kepompong and in various television films on SCTV in Indonesia.

Career
Dinda first began acting in 2001 at the age of six, in the soap opera Wah Cantiknya. She next appeared in the soap opera Inikah Rasanya (2003). In 2004, she won the 8–10 age category at the Copyright Television Star talent show. She continued to work in several soap operas, including Hidayah (2007), where she appeared in several episodes.

Dinda started to become better known after she appeared in the soap opera Kepompong,  which is about a group of teenagers. She was nominated for "Famous Supporting Role Actress" at the 2009 SCTV Awards, but lost to Dinda Kanya Dewi.

Singer
In 2012, Dinda released a mini album of three songs, "Saranghae", "Hari Yang Cerah", and "Malu Mengaku Cinta (MMC)", which is the soundtrack of the FTV series Tikus Kucing Mencari Cinta Lagi. Dinda appears in the show, along with Stuart Collin, Conchita Caroline, and Harry de Fretes.

Discography

Singles

Filmography

Web series 
on youtube

• Pulang Pulang Ganteng 3

• Bitter Love ( Samsung Indonesia )

Television

Film Television

TV commercials

Awards and nominations

References

External links
  Profil di wowkeren.com
 
 
 

21st-century Indonesian actresses
21st-century Indonesian women singers
People from Tasikmalaya
Sundanese people
1995 births
Living people